The 36th South American Championships in Athletics were held in Manaus, Brazil, between 28 and 30 June 1991.

Medal summary

Men's events

Women's events

Medal table

See also
1991 in athletics (track and field)

External links
 Men Results – GBR Athletics
 Women Results – GBR Athletics

S
South American Championships in Athletics
A
1991 in South American sport
International athletics competitions hosted by Brazil